The anime  series Code Geass by Sunrise has been adapted into various series of light novels. First serialized in Kadokawa Shoten's The Sneaker magazine, they are divided into two separate series corresponding with the series two seasons. The first series, Code Geass: Lelouch of the Rebellion, spanned five volumes with the first, labelled as volume 0, released in Japan on April 28, 2007, and the last on February 29, 2008. All five volumes in the first series of novels have been released in English by Bandai Visual as licensed in December 2007. The first volume was released in November 2008 and the last one on February 23, 2010.

The series focus on how the former prince Lelouch Lamperouge obtains a power known as Geass and decides to use it destroy the Holy Britannian Empire. The first novel acts as a prologue, focusing on how Lelouch befriended Suzaku Kururugi, the son of Japan's last prime minister, when the former and his sister Nunnally Lamperouge were sent to Japan as political hostages.

The second novel series, Code Geass: Lelouch of the Rebellion R2, covers the second season of the anime series in which Lelouch continues his battle against the Britannian Empire. It was released in four volumes from May 31, 2008, to February 28, 2009. A single volume side story novel,  was released on March 29, 2008, in Japan. It focuses on the life of teenage girl Kallen Stadtfeld who becomes a soldier from the organization the Black Knights under Lelouch's leadership to defeat Britannia.

Volume list

Code Geass: Lelouch of the Rebellion

First episode

Red Tracks

Second episode

Code Geass: OZ the Reflection

First episode

Second episode

Code Geass: Akito the Exiled

References

Code Geass
Code Geass